The Municipal Corporations Act 1835 (5 & 6 Will 4 c 76), sometimes known as the Municipal Reform Act, was an Act of the Parliament of the United Kingdom that reformed local government in the incorporated boroughs of England and Wales. The legislation was part of the reform programme of the Whigs and followed the Reform Act 1832, which had abolished most of the rotten boroughs for parliamentary purposes.

Royal commission 
The government of Lord Grey, having carried reform out of parliamentary constituencies, turned its attention to local government. In February 1833 a select committee was appointed "to inquire into the state of the Municipal Corporations in England, Wales, and Ireland; and to report if any, and what abuses existed in them, and what measures, in their opinion, it would be most expedient to adopt, with a view to the correction of those abuses". The committee made their report in June 1833, having enquired into a handful of boroughs. The committee found that:

The committee did not believe that they had sufficient powers to carry out a full review of the existing system. They instead recommended the appointment of a royal commission, and that the country be divided into districts with a commissioner responsible for enquiring into boroughs in each district.

The royal commission was appointed by letters patent passed under the great seal. The commission, which was dominated by Radicals, had eighteen members, with two assigned to each district or circuit:
 North Midland: Richard Whitcombe and Alexander Edward Cockburn
 Eastern: George Long and John Buckle
 South Western: Henry Roscoe and Edward Rushton
 Southern: John Elliot Drinkwater and Edward John Gambier
 Western: Charles Austin and James Booth
 Midland: Peregrine Bingham and David Jardine
 Northern: Fortunatus Dwarris and Sampson Augustus Rambull
 North-Western: George Hutton Wilkinson and Thomas Jefferson Hogg
 South-Eastern: Thomas Flowers Ellis and Daniel Maude

The commission's secretary was Joseph Parkes.

Report 
The commission issued its report in 1835. Altogether 285 towns had been investigated. The main conclusions of the report were:
 The corporations were exclusive bodies with no community of interest with the town after which they were named.
 The electorate of some corporations was kept as small as possible.
 Some corporations merely existed as "political engines" for maintaining the ascendancy of a particular party.
 Members of corporations usually served for life and the corporate body was a self-perpetuating entity. Roman Catholics and Dissenters, although no longer disabled from being members, were systematically excluded.
 Vacancies rarely occurred and were not filled by well-qualified persons.
 Some close corporations operated in almost complete secrecy, sometimes secured by oath. Local residents could not obtain information on the operation of the corporation without initiating expensive legal actions.
 The duties of the mayor were, in some places, completely neglected.
 Magistrates were appointed by the corporations on party lines. They were often incompetent and did not have the respect of the inhabitants.
 Juries in many boroughs were exclusively composed of freemen. As the gift of freedom lay with the corporation, they were political appointees and often dispensed justice on a partisan basis.
 Policing in the boroughs was often not the responsibility of the corporation but of one or more bodies of commissioners. An extreme example was the City of Bath, which had four districts under different authorities, while part of the city had no police whatever.
 Borough funds were "frequently expended in feasting, and in paying the salaries of unimportant officers" rather than on the good government of the borough. In some places funds had been expended on public works without adequate supervision, and large avoidable debts had accrued. This often arose from contracts being given to members of the corporation or their friends or relations. Municipal property was also treated as if it were only for the use of the corporation and not the general population.

The Commission concluded its report by stating that:
...the existing Municipal Corporations of England and Wales neither possess nor deserve the confidence or respect of Your Majesty's subjects, and that a thorough reform must be elected, before they can become, what we humbly submit to Your Majesty they ought to be, useful and efficient instruments of local government.

Effects of the Act
The Act established a uniform system of municipal boroughs, to be governed by town councils elected by ratepayers. The reformed boroughs were obliged to publish their financial accounts and were liable to audit. Each borough was to appoint a salaried town clerk and treasurer who were not to be members of the council.

The Act reformed 178 boroughs. The Burgh Reform Act 1833 had already carried similar reforms in Scotland. Similar legislation would not be introduced in Ireland until the Municipal Reform Act 1840. There remained more than 100 unreformed boroughs, which generally either fell into desuetude or were replaced later under the terms of the Act. The last of these was not reformed or abolished until 1886. The Act did not extend to the City of London which remains a sui generis authority.

The Act allowed unincorporated towns to petition for incorporation. The industrial towns of the Midlands and North quickly took advantage of this, with Birmingham and Manchester becoming boroughs as soon as 1838. Altogether, 62 additional boroughs were incorporated under the Act.

The new corporations had annual elections, with a third of the councillors up for election each year. The council also elected aldermen to serve on the council, with a six-year term. Towns were divided into wards.

The Act was repealed "subject to the exceptions and qualifications in this Act mentioned" by section 5 of, and Part I of the First Schedule to, the Municipal Corporations Act 1882.

The 178 reformed boroughs 

The list shows the style by which the unreformed corporation was known, and the date of its governing charter. In most cases this was the last in a succession of charters granted by a number of monarchs. In a few cases boroughs had no charter, or the charter was lost.

See also
Municipal Corporations Act

Notes

References

Further reading

External links 
 The original Act
 Historyhome.co.uk – a web article providing background information on the Act.

United Kingdom Acts of Parliament 1835
1835 in British law
Local government legislation in England and Wales
Boroughs of the United Kingdom